David Cobb may refer to:

David Cobb (American football) (born 1993), American football player
David Cobb (Massachusetts politician) (1748–1830), U.S. Congressman
David Cobb (artist) (1921–2014), artist
David Cobb (activist) (born 1962), American activist and politician
Dave Cobb (born 1974), record producer